Kashirsky District is the name of several administrative and municipal districts in Russia:
Kashirsky District, Moscow Oblast, an administrative and municipal district of Moscow Oblast
Kashirsky District, Voronezh Oblast, an administrative and municipal district of Voronezh Oblast

See also
Kashirsky (disambiguation)

References